List of parishes by province and commune for the Roman Catholic Archdiocese of Genoa.

Liguria

Province of Genoa

Piedmont

Province of Alessandria

References

Genoa